Lanciere was the name of at least three ships of the Italian Navy and may refer to:

 , a  launched in 1907 and discarded in 1923.
 , a  launched in 1938 and foundered in 1942.
 , a  launched in 1942 as USS Taylor and transferred to Italy in 1969. She was struck in 1971.

Italian Navy ship names